Vijay Prakash Yadav is an Indian Politician. He was a Member of the Bihar Legislative Assembly from Jamui until 2020 and former Minister for Labour Resource Department, Government of Bihar from 2015 to 2017. He is younger brother of former Union Minister Of State For Water Resources and senior RJD leader Jaiprakash Narayan Yadav.

References

State cabinet ministers of Bihar
Members of the Bihar Legislative Assembly
People from Jamui
Living people
Year of birth missing (living people)